Socorro Sofío Ramírez Hernández (born 27 June 1967) is a Mexican politician affiliated with the PRD. He currently serves as Senator of the LXII Legislature of the Mexican Congress representing Guerrero. He also served as Deputy during the LXI Legislature.

References

1967 births
Living people
Politicians from Guerrero
Members of the Senate of the Republic (Mexico)
Members of the Chamber of Deputies (Mexico)
Party of the Democratic Revolution politicians
21st-century Mexican politicians
Members of the Congress of Guerrero
Autonomous University of Guerrero alumni